Coleman Milne is a coachbuilder in the United Kingdom that specialises in converting cars into funeral vehicles, stretched limousines, preparation of police vehicles and other specialist vehicles.  Coleman Milne creates, builds, and sells hearses and limousines in the UK.

The company’s range of customers includes corporations, financial institutions, nationalised industries, local authorities, government departments, police constabularies, limousine hire companies and funeral directors. Vehicles have also been supplied to British and overseas royal families.  They originally stretched the Ford Zephyr, later moving on to the Ford Granada upon which a number of versions such as the Minster, Dorchester, and Grosvenor were based. As of the autumn of 1982 the Granada-based Dorchester was also available in an estate version with elongated rear doors, called the "Windsor".

Vehicles

 Ford Cardinal Hearse
 Ford Dorchester Limousine
 Ford Grosvenor Limousine
 Mercedes E-Class-based Hearse/Limousine
 Rolls-Royce - based Hearse & Limousine
 Mondeo Estate Removal Vehicle
 The Sure-Lift Removal Ambulance
 Galaxy Removal Vehicle

History
Coleman Milne was founded by John Coleman and Roderick Milne in 1953. At first they specialised in vehicle body repairs and horse boxes. They quickly found a niche in using those skills to create limousines and funeral hearses. In 1992 a management buy-out resulted in becoming a trading division under the holding company name of Woodall Nicholson Limited.

References

External links
 Coleman Milne Website

Coachbuilders of the United Kingdom
Companies based in Bolton